The 2018 Internazionali Femminili di Brescia was a professional tennis tournament played on outdoor clay courts. It was the eleventh edition of the tournament and was part of the 2018 ITF Women's Circuit. It took place in Brescia, Italy, on 4–10 June 2018.

Singles main draw entrants

Seeds 

 1 Rankings as of 28 May 2018.

Other entrants 
The following players received a wildcard into the singles main draw:
  Kaia Kanepi
  Alice Matteucci
  Stefania Rubini
  Lucrezia Stefanini

The following players received entry using protected rankings:
  Elizabeth Halbauer
  Réka Luca Jani
  Anne Schäfer

The following players received entry from the qualifying draw:
  Nicoleta Dascălu
  Nathaly Kurata
  Katarzyna Piter
  Ludmilla Samsonova

Champions

Singles

 Kaia Kanepi def.  Martina Trevisan, 6–4, 6–3

Doubles
 
 Cristina Dinu /  Ganna Poznikhirenko def.  Alexandra Panova /  Anastasia Pribylova, 6–3, 7–6(8–6)

External links 
 2018 Internazionali Femminili di Brescia at ITFtennis.com
 Official website

2018 ITF Women's Circuit
2018 in Italian tennis
Tennis tournaments in Italy